Wadi al-Hasa, known from the Hebrew Bible as the valley and brook of Zered , is a wadi in western Jordan. It is located between the Karak and Tafilah governorates.

Geography 
The wadi is very big and long and ends in the Dead Sea at the town of Al-Safi. At no time during the year does the water stop flowing. There are many springs and other sources that feed it, particularly the part in the governorate of Tafilah. It is longer and wider than Wadi al-Moujib, which is located to the north.

The wadi is part of the Dead Sea river basin in Jordan, whose waters feed it and then accumulate in the winter on the south side of the Dead Sea. The wadi's water gathers in the desert wadis and streams whose basin reaches the al-Jafr region, and is then transported to the Jordan Valley and eventually the Dead Sea.

Water use 
The wadi area is intensely used by farmers who use the water for irrigation, mostly for vegetables like tomatoes and melons.

In 1999, Jordan built a dam atop the wadi, known as the Al-Tannur Dam. The wadi has special significance for walks and for hiking. A group of hiking clubs have been organized, most of which end at the Jordan Valley, where there are many mineral hot springs, which are said to have many health benefits.

Throughout the wadi there are many farms, most of them vegetable farms, above stream of the Al-Tannur Dam. There are also olive trees and clovers. There are fountains and streams that are suitable for drinking which are used by the local residents. There is natural scenery and it contains bodies of water that have formed over time because the stones were carved with water, reaching a depth of more than six meters. The wadi is rich in fish, caught by both residents and visitors.

Hebrew Bible 
Zared (also Zered)  is a name used in the Torah for a brook and its valley. From the context it is understood that it lay in Edom, south of the border to Moab which is marked by the River Arnon, modern Wadi Mujib.

According to Peter C. Craigie, Zered's "exact location is uncertain."

In the wadi there are many religious sites, such as the Nabataean temple Khirbet et-Tannur and the Nabataean village and sanctuary Khirbet ed-Dharih. Both sites are famous for the shrines that contain temples to the Nabataean god of evil, Dushara. Though the name of the wadi is sometimes mentioned in a few biblical texts. Biblical archaeologists attribute this to the use of the wadi as a place of worship.

Archaeological Research 
The archaeological excavations at Wadi al-Hasa have contributed to a rethinking in archaeology of the use of tools made from bone or bone-like material. Some of the evidence at the site of Ain el-Buhira, a site located at the eastern end of the wadi. The site is characterized by a lake, and sediments and stone formations like marls and tufa formations that give insight into the drainage system that was built at the wadi in the Upper Pleistocene period, between 24,000 and 19,000 BP. Coinman suggests (in 1996) that both bone and blade technologies were more common in this period than previously thought.

References

External links 
 For a series of spectacular photos, see: 
 Photos of Wadi al-Hasa at the American Center of Research

Hasa
Hebrew Bible rivers
Rivers of Jordan
Dead Sea basin
Hebrew Bible valleys